El Castillo de los monstruos is a 1964 Argentine film directed by Carlos Rinaldi.

Cast
 Luis Sandrini	as El Profesor
 Lola del Pino	as Miedosa
 Silvia Solar as Pelusa
 Diego Barquinero as El negrito - chico de goma
 Pablo Blanco as Hombre lobo
 John Gilmore as Hombre sin piernas
 Renato Mendoza as Manzanita
 Frieda Pushnik as Torso vivo
 Isabel Torres as La coquetita

External links
 

1964 films
1960s Spanish-language films
Argentine black-and-white films
Films directed by Carlos Rinaldi
Argentine comedy-drama films
1960s Argentine films